Dag Detter is a Swedish investment advisor, as well as an author and speaker on the topic of public commercial assets. He is the former President of Stattum and Director at the Swedish Ministry of Industry, leading the restructuring of the government portfolio of public assets during the reforms 1998-2001.

Together with Stefan Fölster, he is the author of two books, including The Public Wealth of Nations : How Management of Public Assets Can Boost or Bust Economic Growth (Palgrave, 2015), included in The Economist — Books of the Year 2015 and the Financial Times FT's Best Books of the Year 2015. The book argues that better management of public assets would increase global living standards and improve the fabric of democratic institutions.

In 2017 The Brookings Institution Press published The Public Wealth of Cities : How to Unlock Hidden Assets to Boost Growth and Prosperity. This book focuses on the local level of governments and says that while many cities and counties are scrambling to find money to survive, they are sitting on an enormous untapped wealth which could be used to pay not only for infrastructure but also investments in any important social functions The book states that economic vitality and financial stability to cities could be achieved by focusing on public wealth and shifting attention and resources from short-term spending to longer-term investments through the creation of urban wealth funds.

Detter has also written for the Financial Times, The Wall Street Journal, Project Syndicate, Foreign Affairs, Foreign Policy, International Monetary Fund, The World Bank, Chicago Tribune, Public Finance, and The Globe and Mail, as well as the World Economic Forum.

Works 
The Public Wealth of Nations : How Management of Public Assets Can Boost or Bust Economic Growth, London: Palgrave, 2015, 
The Public Wealth of Cities : How to Unlock Hidden Assets to Boost Growth and Prosperity, Washington, D.C. : Brookings Institution Press, 2017, 
"The Rise of Legal Cheating: People think the system is rigged and are losing faith in democracy",  Prospect Magazine, April 24, 2017
Unlocking Public Wealth: Governments could do a better job managing their assets, Washington, D.C. : International Monetary Fund, Finance & Development,  March 2018
 "The potential of state commercial property: mapping and managing non-financial public assets", International Journal of Public Policy, Vol. 15, Nos. 1/2, pp. 111–124.

References

External links
 Welcome to the ways of the market: Financial Times; November 12, 1999
 Self-assembly solution: Financial Times, March 17, 2009
 Swedish lessons for EU bank owners: Financial Times, October 8, 2012
 Build houses on Britain's wasted public land: Financial Times, October 7, 2015
 Public sector needs to do a better job with assets: Financial Times, April 15, 2016
 America's Governmental Accounting Standards Board is giving ruinously bad advice: Financial Times, August 23, 2017
 US cities must unlock the value of the land they sit on: Financial Times, July 21, 2017
 Governments Should Be Run More Like Businesses: Barron's, October 12, 2018
 The World's Forgotten Asset Class: Barron's, September 7, 2018
 On public wealth, ignorance is not bliss: Financial Times, October 17, 2018
 Sustainable Cities: Citi GPS, April, 2018

1959 births
Living people
Writers from Malmö
Swedish male writers
Financial writers
Swedish bankers